The Marist School is an independent Catholic day school for girls aged 2–18 with a co-ed Nursery in Sunninghill near Ascot, Berkshire, England.

The Marist School is a Catholic school but welcomes all Christians and other faiths who are in sympathy with the schools' ethos. Once girls reach 11 they often join Senior and Sixth Form until age 18 years. In Preparatory, there are two phases: Early Years and Preparatory.

History
The school, as it is today, was founded as a result of the London bombings during World War II. The Marist Sisters had founded a convent and boarding school in Richmond, London (then in the county of Surrey) in 1870. During the air raids of 1940, although there were no casualties, the convent did suffer irreparable damage, forcing the sisters to seek another place. They temporarily relocated to East Sheen before purchasing Frognal Estate in 1947 where the school has been located ever since. The school continued to expand with a new building for the Prep department opened in 1970. Boarding was eventually abolished. The school used to be owned by The Marist Order before being sold to Concept Education in 2022

Campus
The school is situated within  of woodland in the village of Sunninghill, Berkshire. The site includes the Senior and Sixth Form Phase, the Nursery and Preparatory Phase, a science block, drama studio, an indoor swimming pool, a music block, a recording studio, large playing fields, a pond, netball courts, an AstroTurf pitch and a multi-purpose Sports Hall, officially opened in March 2017 by the Duke of York.

Preparatory School

Girls and boys enter the Early Years Department from age 2 and girls then move on to Preparatory from age 4 to 11 years. The Preparatory school compound is known as "The Rosary". Many girls then continue their education in Senior and Sixth Form from age 11 to 18 years.

References

External links
School Website
Profile on the Independent Schools Council website
Profile on the Girls' Schools Association website

Roman Catholic private schools in the Diocese of Portsmouth
Member schools of the Girls' Schools Association
Private schools in the Royal Borough of Windsor and Maidenhead
Girls' schools in Berkshire
Educational institutions established in 1947
1947 establishments in England